Fifth Colvmn Records was founded in 1990 by Zalman Fishman, with vocalist Jared Louche employed as general manager, and was recognized for its industrial music roster. The label made its debut with an EP, titled 10 Ton Pressure, by the industrial rock group Chemlab and in 1993 released the band's critically acclaimed studio album Burn Out at the Hydrogen Bar. The label dissolved in 1997 and made its final release the various artists compilation World War Underground.

Key

List of releases

Main Discography

Side Discographys

References

General

Specific

External links

Discographies of American record labels